The Guard Jaeger Regiment is a Finnish Army unit located in Santahamina, an island district of Helsinki. The regiment trains Guard jaegers for fighting military operations in urban terrain (MOUT). The primary function of wartime units formed from the reservists trained by the regiment would be the defence of the capital Helsinki.

Organisation

The commander of the regiment commands the following units:
 Command
 Personnel division
 Training division
 Logistics Center
 Operative division
 Helsinki Guard
 Guard Battalion (KAARTP)
 1. Military Police Company (1.SPOLK)
 2. Military Police Company (2.SPOLK)
 Transport Company (KULJK)
 Uusimaa Jaeger Battalion (UUDJP)
 1st Jaeger Company (1. JK)
 2nd Jaeger Company (2. JK)
 HQ and Signals Company (EVK)
 Sports School
 Recon Company
 Coaching center
Additionally the assistant commander commands the following functions
 Uusimaa Regional Office
 The Guards Band
The primary function of the regiment is to train all wartime units from the conscripts serving in the regiment, specializing in the production of FIBUA-trained units. In addition, the regiment is the ceremonial unit of the Finnish Defence Forces, responsible for the Guard of Honour of the President of Finland. The Guards Band is similarly the representative band of the Defence Forces. As the largest unit located in the Garrison of Helsinki, the regiment is responsible for almost all the supplies of the troops and headquarters located in the capital region.

The conscripts of the regiment arrive mostly from the capital region and surrounding region of Uusimaa. In addition, the regiment is one of the most usual placements for the expatriate Finns and recently naturalized immigrants. The conscripts serving in  special duties at the Defence Staff are also formally part of the regiment.

History 
The Guard Jaeger Regiment continue the traditions of historical units that include the 3rd Finnish Guards' Rifle Battalion, which had from the year 1829 Young Guard and from the year 1878 onwards Old Guard status in the Imperial Russian Army, the Jaegers of the Finnish Civil War and the 2nd Jaeger Battalion from the Second World War.

The traditions are kept alive by the Guard Jaeger Regiment Guild.

References

External links 

Guard Jaeger Regiment's official homepage 
Recruit's Guide to Guard Jaeger Regiment 

Regiments of Finland
Guards regiments
Guards of honour